Bahra (Syriac: ܒܗܪܐ) is a political weekly newspaper issued by the Assyrian Democratic Movement. The paper is printed in Baghdad and comes out in Arabic and Syriac. It was first published on 26 June 1982.

References

1982 establishments in Iraq
Arabic-language newspapers
Newspapers published in Iraq
Mass media in Baghdad
Publications established in 1982
Weekly newspapers